The Bahamas competed at the 1980 Summer Paralympics in Arnhem, Netherlands. The country's delegation consisted of six competitors in two sports, track and field athletics, and swimming. Two of the athletes, Christine Morgan and Olivia Armbrister, competed in both sports.

Medalists

Athletics

Swimming

References

Nations at the 1980 Summer Paralympics
1980
Paralympics